Daniel Kaiser (born 18 October 1990) is a German professional footballer who plays as a midfielder for NOFV-Oberliga Nord club SV Tasmania Berlin.

External links
 
 

1990 births
Living people
German footballers
Footballers from Stuttgart
Association football midfielders
3. Liga players
Regionalliga players
Stuttgarter Kickers II players
Stuttgarter Kickers players
ZFC Meuselwitz players
FC Viktoria 1889 Berlin players
SGV Freiberg players
SV Tasmania Berlin players